Levon Louis is an electronic musician, writer, and video game developer. Most of his work is in the action, sci-fi, and horror genres of games including Silent Hill, Mortal Kombat, and Assassin’s Creed. Levon has produced and directed audio for numerous video games since 2001, when Microsoft first licensed his techno for early Xbox titles. He has collaborated with members of popular bands (Beck, Mars Volta) to create scores and soundtracks for games and other media.

Biography

Louis appeared in Newsweek Magazine for break-dancing at the age of 10. That same year he watched his father's new-wave band play for stadium crowds while on-tour with Duran Duran. He became a DJ in the 6th grade when the school's hired DJ was a no-show. Levon began making electronic music in his teens influenced by hip-hop and electronic artists like Laurie Anderson, Kraftwerk, Art of Noise, and Jean-Michelle Jarre.

While attending Stephen F. Austin State University in East Texas, Levon played in different types of bands and on different instruments. Sometimes he was a front-man, sometimes not, often blending sung lyrics with MC-style rap vocals. He threw rave-parties in his reggae band's rehearsal space and collaborated with party crews in Houston and Dallas on larger events. His first releases on vinyl were a blend of house, electro, and techno appearing on City Boy Records of Detroit.

Press & Awards

He shares a BAFTA Award with Microsoft for "Best Use of Audio" in 2007 for Crackdown, several G.A.N.G. Award nominations for projects in 2008 including "Best Handled Audio" for Transformers alongside "Best Instrumental", and "Music of the Year" for The Golden Compass and In 2011, Assassin's Creed: Brotherhood received an Academy Award nomination (AIAS) for "Outstanding Achievement in Audio".

Discography

Albums (as Lunatex, Absynthesis, Mushroom Lounge, or Levon Louis)

 Abducted (Ewax, 2000)
 Absynthesis (Next-Gen, 2007)
 Live Technical Mix (Next-Gen, 2007)
 Mushroom Lounge (Mushroom Lounge Recordings, 2008)

Various singles also appear on 12" vinyl and CD compilations. (Chemical Minded Records, For Those Who Know, City Boy Records-Detroit, Rebel Crew Records, Dark Horizons)

Releases (as member of Dead P.A.)

 The Dead Will Rise (Goinka Records, 2007)
 DEAD P.A. vs Devine & Emily Play 12" (2nd Movement/Goinka Records, 2008) vinyl release

References

External links 
 Levon Louis Official Website
 Mushroom Lounge Official Website

American electronic musicians
Stephen F. Austin State University alumni
Living people
1974 births